Domingo Pérez is a Spanish municipality of Toledo province, in the autonomous community of Castile-La Mancha. Its population is 498 and its surface is 1031 km², with a density of 38.31 people/km². The mayor is Mr. Blas Rodríguez Gomez de las Heras, of the Partido Popular. The Partido Popular has 5 municipal councillors, the Partido Socialista Obrero has one and there is an independent.

In the 2004 Spanish General Election, the Partido Popular got 89.5% of the vote, and the Partido Socialista Obrero got 10.5%, in Domingo Pérez.

References

Municipalities in the Province of Toledo